Native American tribes in Texas are the Native American tribes who are currently based in Texas and the Indigenous peoples of the Americas who historically lived in Texas. 

Many individual Native Americans, whose tribes are headquartered in other states, reside in Texas.

The state formed the Texas Commission for Indian Affairs in 1965 to oversee state-tribal relations; however, the commission was dissolved in 1989.

Federally recognized tribes 

Texas has three federally recognized tribes. They have met the seven criteria of an American Indian tribe: 
 being an American Indian entity since at least 1900
 a predominant part of the group forms a distinct community and has done so throughout history into the present
 holding political influence over its members
 having governing documents including membership criteria
 members having ancestral descent from historic American Indian tribes
 not being members of other existing federally recognized tribes
 not being previously terminated by the U.S. Congress.
The three federally recognized tribes in Texas are:
 Alabama-Coushatta Tribes of Texas, originally from Tennessee and Alabama
 Kickapoo Traditional Tribe of Texas, originally from the Great Lakes
 Ysleta Del Sur Pueblo of Texas originally from New Mexico.

American Indian reservations
These are three Indian Reservations in Texas:
 Alabama-Coushatta Reservation, in Polk County, Texas
 Kickapoo Reservation, in Maverick County, Texas
 Ysleta del Sur Pueblo, in El Paso County, Texas.

State-recognized tribes 
Texas has "no legal mechanism to recognize tribes," as journalists Graham Lee Brewer and Tristan Ahtone wrote. State-recognized tribes do not have the government-to-government relationship with the United States federal government that federally recognized tribes do. Texas has no state-recognized tribes.

Texas Senate Bill 274 to formally recognize the Lipan Apache Tribe of Texas, introduced in January 2021, died in committee.

Historical tribes of Texas 
These are some of the tribes that have existed in what is now Texas. Many were forcibly removed to Indian Territory, now Oklahoma, in the 19th century. Others no longer exist as tribes but may have living descendants.

 Adai people, formerly eastern Texas
 Apache people, western Texas, Arizona, New Mexico, Oklahoma
 Lipan Apache, southwest
 Salinero, formerly west
 Teya, formerly Panhandle
 Vaquero, also Querecho, formerly northwestern Texas, possible ancestral Apache people
 Aranama, formerly southeast
 Atakapa, formerly Gulf Coast
 Akokisa, formerly Galveston Bay, Gulf Coast
 Bidai, formerly Trinity River, Gulf Coast
 Deadose, formerly southeast
 Patiri, formerly San Jacinto River
 Biloxi, formerly Neches River in the 19th century, now Louisiana
 Caddo, formerly eastern Texas, now Oklahoma
 Cacachau, formerly eastern, now Oklahoma
 Eyeish, formerly eastern, now Oklahoma
 Hainai, formerly eastern, now Oklahoma
 Kadohadacho, formerly northeast, now Oklahoma
 Nabedache, formerly eastern, now Oklahoma
 Nabiti, formerly eastern, now Oklahoma
 Nacogdoche, formerly eastern, now Oklahoma
 Nacono, formerly eastern, now Oklahoma
 Nadaco, formerly eastern, now Oklahoma
 Nanatsoho, formerly Red River, now Oklahoma
 Nasoni (Upper), formerly Red River, now Oklahoma
 Natchitoches, formerly Red River, now Oklahoma
 Nechaui, formerly eastern, now Oklahoma
 Neche, formerly eastern, now Oklahoma

 Comanche, formerly north and west, now Oklahoma
 Coahuiltecan, formerly southern
 Comecrudo, formerly southern
 Ervipiame, formerly south and central Texas
 Geier, formerly south central
 Pajalat, formerly central
 Pastia, formerly south-central
 Payaya, formerly south-central
 Quepano, formerly south-central
 Unpuncliegut, formerly south coast
Xarame, formerly south-central
 Dotchetonne, formerly northeastern
 Escanjaque Indians, formerly north-central
 Jumano, formerly southwestern
 La Junta, formerly west
 Karankawa, formerly south coast
 Kiowa, formerly panhandle, now Oklahoma
 Manso, formerly west
 Quems, formerly southwest
 Quicuchabe, formerly west
 Quide, formerly west
 Suma, formerly west, joined Apaches
 Teyas, Panhandle

 Tonkawa, formerly southeast, now Oklahoma
 Mayeye, formerly south
 Yojuane, formerly east-central
 Wichita, formerly north-central, now Oklahoma
 Kichai, formerly north, now Oklahoma
 Taovaya, formerly north in the 19th century, now Oklahoma
 Tawakoni, formerly north and east in the 19th century, now Oklahoma
Waco, formerly north, now Oklahoma

Unrecognized organizations 
More than 30 organizations claim to represent historic tribes within Texas; however, these groups are unrecognized, meaning they do not meet the minimum criteria of federally recognized tribes and are not state-recognized tribes. Some of these cultural heritage groups form 501(c)(3) nonprofit organizations.

See also
 :Category:Native American tribes in Texas
 Indigenous peoples of the Great Plains
 Aridoamerica#Aridoamerica_cultures

References

External links 
  Tribal Contacts, Texas Historical Commission
 American Indians, Texas State Historical Society

 
Texas
 
 
Texas
Texas